Theodore Rex (2001) is a biography of U.S. President Theodore Roosevelt written by author Edmund Morris.  It is the second volume of a trilogy, preceded by the Pulitzer Prize-winning The Rise of Theodore Roosevelt (1979) and succeeded by Colonel Roosevelt which was published on November 23, 2010.

Theodore Rex covers the years of the presidency of Theodore Roosevelt, from 1901 to 1909, covering events such as the construction of the Panama Canal, as well as the Roosevelt Administration's political, diplomatic and military exploits during the aforementioned period.

Critical reception
In City Journal, critic Ryan L. Cole praised the book along with the rest of the trilogy. He said that Theodore Rex showed the apotheosis of Roosevelt's life in a way that is "epic in scope and vast in detail".

The book won the 2001 Los Angeles Times Book Prize for Biography.

Notes

References
Morris, Edmund (2002).  Theodore Rex. New York: Random House.

External links
C-SPAN Q&A Interview with Morris on his Roosevelt trilogy, November 21, 2010

2001 non-fiction books
American biographies
Books about Theodore Roosevelt
Presidency of Theodore Roosevelt
Random House books